Henrik Dalsgaard (born 27 July 1989) is a Danish professional footballer who plays as a right-back for Danish Superliga club FC Midtjylland.

Dalsgaard began his professional career in his homeland with AaB, with whom he won the Danish league and cup double in the 2013–14 season. He transferred to Zulte Waregem in 2015 and won the Belgian Cup in the second of his two seasons with the club. A move to England with Championship club Brentford followed in 2017 and in 2021 he was part of the Brentford squad which was promoted to the Premier League. Dalsgaard is a current Denmark international and was a member of the Danes' 2018  World Cup squad.

Club career

AaB
Dalsgaard began his career as a forward with Danish lower-league clubs BMK 90, FK Viborg, Hersom/Bjerregrav IF and Møldrup/Tostrup IF. After scoring prolifically for Møldrup/Tostrup IF, he signed a two-year contract with Danish Superliga club AaB on a free transfer in December 2008 and no compensation was paid to his previous clubs, due to the lack of a national transfer system in Denmark. He made the first professional appearances of his career late in the 2008–09 season and scored his first professional goal in a 2–2 draw with FC Nordsjælland on 31 May 2009.

Dalsgaard became a regular in the team over the course of the 2009–10 and 2010–11 seasons and was moved from his forward position onto the wing and then to right back by the 2011–12 season. He made 21 appearances and scored two goals during the 2013–14 season, in which AaB won the Danish Superliga and Danish Cup double. Dalsgaard remained with the club until December 2015, when he departed on a free transfer. He made 194 appearances and scored 10 goals during eight seasons at the Nordjyske Arena.

Zulte Waregem
In December 2015, Dalsgaard moved to Belgium to join Pro League club Zulte Waregem on a -year contract, with an option for a further year. In an 18-month spell affected by a hip injury, he made 38 appearances, scored 9 goals and helped the club to win the 2016–17 Belgian Cup. Dalsgaard left the club on 23 May 2017.

Brentford
On 23 May 2017, Dalsgaard moved to England to join Championship club Brentford on a three-year contract for an undisclosed fee (reported to be £1 million), effective 1 July 2017. He immediately displaced previous first-choice right back Maxime Colin and made the position his own after Colin's departure at the end of the summer transfer window. Dalsgaard continued as a regular in the team, despite suffering with a concussion and a heel injury during the opening months of the season. A heel injury suffered during a 2–0 victory over Birmingham City on 1 November 2017 saw Dalsgaard miss three months of the season. He regained his place in early February 2018 and his scored his first goal for the club with the only goal for the match versus Nottingham Forest on 10 April. Dalsgaard finished the 2017–18 season with 32 appearances and one goal.

Dalsgaard was the team's regular starting right back through the first half of the 2018–19 season. In February 2019, head coach Thomas Frank reported that Dalsgaard had stepped up into a leadership role within the squad and later in the month, a lack of available centre backs at the club saw him pressed into service on the right side of a three-man central defence. He finished the season with 43 appearances and two goals.

After beginning the 2019–20 season as an ever-present at right back, Dalsgaard signed a one-year contract extension on 29 November 2019. In addition, his leadership role within the squad was recognised with the vice-captaincy. Dalsgaard made a career-high 47 appearances and scored two goals during the season, with one coming as a late consolation in the 2–1 2020 Championship play-off Final defeat to Fulham.

Dalsgaard was again Thomas Frank's first choice right back during the 2020–21 season and he deputised for captain Pontus Jansson during the latter's spells out injured. Despite missing the final 9 matches of the regular season with a knee injury, Dalsgaard returned to play in each of Brentford's three 2021 playoff matches and he celebrated promotion to the Premier League with a 2–0 victory over Swansea City in the Final. Owing to the 79th minute substitution of captain Pontus Jansson, Dalsgaard took the armband for the remainder of the match. He finished the 2020–21 season with 40 appearances and two goals. Having entered the final month of his contract, Dalsgaard transferred away from the Brentford Community Stadium on 7 June 2021. He ended his four-year spell with 162 appearances, seven goals and as Brentford's most-capped international player, with 22 caps won while contracted to the club.

FC Midtjylland
On 7 June 2021, Dalsgaard returned to Denmark to sign a three-year contract with Superliga club FC Midtjylland on a free transfer, effective 1 July 2021. He made 43 appearances and scored two goals during the 2021–22 Danish Cup-winning season.

International career
Dalsgaard represented Denmark at youth level and won 12 caps for the U20 and U21 teams. He made one appearance for the Denmark League XI in 2013. Dalsgaard's form for Zulte Waregem during the 2015–16 season saw him win four caps for the senior team during the second half of the campaign. In recognition of his contribution to Denmark's qualification for the 2018 World Cup, Dalsgaard was named in the 2017 Denmark Team of the Year. At the World Cup, he played every minute of the four matches of Denmark's run to the last-16. Dalsgaard scored his first international goal at any level with an injury time equaliser in a 3–3 Euro 2020 qualifying draw with Switzerland on 26 March 2019.

Personal life
Dalsgaard attended Viborg Business School and worked for Skals Elektronik.

Career statistics

Club

International

Scores and results list Denmark's goal tally first, score column indicates score after each Dalsgaard goal.

Honours
AaB
Danish Superliga: 2013–14
Danish Cup: 2013–14

Zulte Waregem
Belgian Cup: 2016–17

Brentford
EFL Championship play-offs: 2021
FC Midtjylland

 Danish Cup: 2021–22

Individual
Denmark Team of the Year: 2017

References

External links

Henrik Dalsgaard at resol.dr.dk
Henrik Dalsgaard at brentfordfc.com
Henrik Dalsgaard at fcm.dk

1989 births
Living people
People from Viborg Municipality
Danish men's footballers
Denmark youth international footballers
Denmark under-21 international footballers
Denmark international footballers
Association football forwards
AaB Fodbold players
S.V. Zulte Waregem players
Brentford F.C. players
Danish Superliga players
Belgian Pro League players
English Football League players
2018 FIFA World Cup players
Danish expatriate men's footballers
Expatriate footballers in Belgium
Expatriate footballers in England
Danish expatriate sportspeople in Belgium
Danish expatriate sportspeople in England
FC Midtjylland players
Sportspeople from the Central Denmark Region